Sir Charles Edmund Fox, KCSI (18 Feb. 1854–9 Oct. 1918) was a British barrister and judge in British Burma. He was Chief Judge of the Chief Court of Lower Burma from 1906 to 1917.

The son of John Fox of St John's, Newfoundland, Charles Edmund Fox was educated at Prior Park College, Bath. He was called to the English bar in 1877, was Government Advocate, Burma from 1884 to 1900, Judge of Chief Court of Lower Burma from 1900 and Chief Judge of the Chief Court of Lower Burma from 1906 to 1917. In retirement he settled in Gloucester.

Fox married Ethel Mary Hobhouse, eldest daughter of Sir Charles Parry Hobhouse, 3rd Baronet (see Hobhouse baronets), in 1877.

References 

 https://en.wikisource.org/wiki/The_Indian_Biographical_Dictionary_(1915)/Fox,_Sir_Charles_Edmund
 https://www.ukwhoswho.com/view/10.1093/ww/9780199540891.001.0001/ww-9780199540884-e-196564
 http://seasiavisions.library.cornell.edu/catalog/seapage:362_66

Knights Bachelor
1918 deaths
Knights Commander of the Order of the Star of India
People educated at Prior Park College
Members of the Bar of England and Wales
British Burma judges
British people in British Burma